Oman competed at the 2022 World Athletics Championships in Eugene, United States, from 15 to 24 July 2022. It entered one athlete.

Results

Men

 Field events

References

Nations at the 2022 World Athletics Championships
World Athletics Championships
2022